Allegiant Airs scheduled destinations (excluding charter operations) are listed below.  Its longest flight within the continental United States is Cincinnati to Los Angeles (approximately 1900 miles), and its reservation system does not allow travelers to book multi-segment flights (for example, Oakland to Cleveland via Phoenix albeit the airline operates both sectors).

List

Terminated destinations

Maintenance destinations

These are destinations Allegiant flies to for aircraft maintenance.

References

Lists of airline destinations